Zatrnik ( or , in older sources Zaternik) is a settlement in the Municipality of Gorje in the Upper Carniola region of Slovenia.

Name
Zatrnik was recorded in historical sources as Za Ternikom in 1763–1787. The name is a fused prepositional phrase that has lost inflection, derived from za trnikom 'behind the thorny thicket'.

History
Zatrnik had a population of 18 (in four houses) in 1880 and 23 (in four houses) in 1900. Zatrnik was deemed annexed by Krnica in 1952, ending any existence it had as a separate settlement. Zatrnik became a separate settlement in 2020, when it was separated from Krnica.

References

External links
Zatrnik at Geopedia

Populated places in the Municipality of Gorje